Plestiodon egregius, the mole skink,  is a species of small lizard endemic to the Southeastern United States.

Taxonomy
The species is subdivided into five subspecies, including the nominotypical subspecies:
Florida Keys mole skink, P. e. egregius Baird, 1859: occurs only on some of the Florida Keys.
Cedar Key mole skink, P. e. insularis (Mount, 1965): occurs only on three islands at Cedar Key.
Bluetail mole skink, P. e. lividus (Mount, 1965): occurs only in interior central Florida; shares its Florida Scrub habitat with the Sand Skink.
Peninsula mole skink, P. e. onocrepis Cope, 1871.
Northern mole skink, P. e. similis (McConkey, 1957).

The species was first described by Baird in 1859 as Plestiodon egregius. In 1871, P. onocrepis was described by Cope. In 1875, the two species were reassigned to the genus Eumeces. In 1935, two subspecies were defined, E. e. egregius and E. e. onocrepis, and in 1957, E. e. similis was separated from E. e. egregius. In 2005 North American members of genus Eumeces were reassigned to Plestiodon.

Status
The first three subspecies listed above are protected, and the bluetail mole skink is classified as a federally-threatened species since 1987. The major threats to all three subspecies are habitat destruction due to residential, commercial, and agricultural development and over-collection by herpetological enthusiasts. The remaining two subspecies are rather common, though elusive. The northern mole skink also occurs in southern Alabama and Georgia.

Habitat
Mole skinks are found in sandhills and scrub. They often like to be buried underground and especially like to bask in the upper layers of Southeastern pocket gopher mounds.

Reproduction
Mole skinks reach sexual maturity after one year. The eggs incubate for 31 to 51 days, during which time the female tends the nest.

Bluetail mole skink

Description
The bluetail mole skink is a small, shiny, cylindrical lizard of a brownish color. Juveniles usually have a blue tail which makes up slightly more than half of the animal's total length. Regenerated tails and the tails of older individuals are typically pinkish. The legs are somewhat reduced in size and are used only during surface locomotion, not when the animal "swims" through the sand (Christman 1992). During the breeding season, males develop a colorful orange pattern on their sides.

Habitat and behavior
It shares habitat with the sand skink, which is also endangered, but does not compete with it: whereas the sand skink feeds underground, the bluetail mole skink hunts on the surface.
When threatened, it plays presents its tail and if refused, plays dead.

Diet
Like other mole skinks, it feeds primarily on cockroaches, spiders, and crickets.

Geographic range
It is found in central Florida.
Map should also reflect  Seminole and Orange counties.  Also sighted in Brevard, Marion, and Pasco Counties.

Conservation status
The bluetail mole skink is a federally-threatened species.

References

External links
Comprehensive overview of the Bluetail Mole Skink at the U.S. Fish and Wildlife Service.
Multispecies Recovery Plan for South Florida, section on the Bluetail Mole Skink (PDF file, 147 KB).

Selected literature
Baird, S.F. 1859. Descriptions of New Genera and Species of North American Lizards in the Museum of the Smithsonian Institution. Proc. Acad. Nat. Sci. Philadelphia "1858" [10]: 253-256. ("Plestiodon egregius, Baird", p. 256.)
Christman, S.P. (1992): Endangered: [[blue-tailed mole skink, Eumeces egregius lividus (Mount). Pages 117-122 in P.E. Moler, ed. Rare and endangered biota of Florida. University Press of Florida, Gainesville, Florida.
McConkey, E.H. 1957. The Subspecies of Eumeces egregius, a Lizard of the Southeastern United States. Bull. Florida State Mus. 2 (2): 13-23. ("Eumeces egregius similis, subsp. nov.", pp. 17-18.)
Mount, R.H. (1965): Variation and systematics of the scincoid lizard Eumeces egregius (Baird). Bulletin of the Florida State Museum 9:183-213.
Smith, Hobart M. 2005. Plestiodon: a Replacement Name for Most Members of the Genus Eumeces in North America. Journal of Kansas Herpetology. Number 14. pp. 15-16.
Taylor, E.H. 1936. A Taxonomic Study of the]] Cosmopolitan Scincoid Lizards of the Genus Eumeces with an Account of the Distribution and Relationships of its Species. Univ. Kansas Sci. Bull. "1935" 23 (14): 1-643. (Eumeces egregius, p. 490.)

egregius
Reptiles of the United States
Skink, Mole
Reptiles described in 1859
Taxa named by Spencer Fullerton Baird